Edward "Ted" Hopkins (born 27 May 1949) is retired former Australian rules footballer, businessman and writer. He is most notable for his four-goal effort in the second half of Carlton's remarkable victory in the 1970 VFL Grand Final. Ted currently resides in Melbourne and has one child, Erica Hopkins.

Football career
Hopkins, who came from Moe, played 29 senior games for the Carlton Football Club as a small rover.

Hopkins is most famous for his performance in Carlton's victory over Collingwood in the 1970 VFL Grand Final. Initially starting on the bench, Hopkins was substituted onto the ground as the 19th man for Bert Thornley at half-time. Within fifteen minutes, he had scored three goals, and assisted on another to Alex Jesaulenko – in a purple patch during which Carlton scored seven goals to erase Collingwood's 44-point half-time lead. He scored a fourth goal late in the final quarter, and Carlton would ultimately win the Grand Final by ten points.

After the 1970 Grand Final, he played only one further game for Carlton before retiring from football to pursue other interests. He kicked a career total of 10 goals.

Media career
Hopkins has written several pieces of published fiction and poetry. He has also been employed as a journalist, publisher and radio presenter. His current project is TedSport, focussing on high-performance sports analysis. He was also co-founder of Champion Books, the Backyard Press Printing Co-operative, and Champion Data, a sports-statistics firm that concentrates on Australian rules football.

References

External links
 TedSport

Carlton Football Club players
Carlton Football Club Premiership players
Australian rules footballers from Victoria (Australia)
Moe Football Club players
1949 births
Living people
One-time VFL/AFL Premiership players